Nathaniel Hawthorne Pollard (January 24, 1915 – November 23, 1996) was an American Negro league pitcher between 1946 and 1950.

A native of Alabama City, Alabama, Pollard served in the US Army during World War II. He made his Negro leagues debut in 1946 with the Birmingham Black Barons, and played for the club through 1950. Pollard died in Dolomite, Alabama in 1996 at age 81.

References

External links
 and Seamheads
 Nat Pollard biography from Society for American Baseball Research (SABR)

1915 births
1996 deaths
Birmingham Black Barons players
20th-century African-American sportspeople
Baseball pitchers